Convivencia ("living together") is an academic term, proposed by the Spanish philologist Américo Castro, regarding the period of Spanish history from the Muslim Umayyad conquest of Hispania in the early eighth century until the expulsion of the Jews in 1492. It claims that in the different Moorish Iberian kingdoms, the Muslims, Christians and Jews lived in relative peace. According to this interpretation of history, this period of religious diversity differs from later Spanish and Portuguese history when—as a result of expulsions and forced conversions—Catholicism became the sole religion in the Iberian Peninsula.

However, some voices have challenged the historicity of the above view of intercultural harmony, depicting it as a myth, and claiming that it is a "politically correct" anachronism. According to The Oxford Dictionary of the Middle Ages, "Critics charge that [the term 'convivencia'] too often describes an idealized view of multi-faith harmony and symbiosis, while supporters retort that such a characterization is a distortion of the complex interactions they seek to understand."

Cultural meaning
Convivencia often refers to the interplay of cultural ideas between the three religious groups and ideas of religious tolerance. James Carroll invokes this concept and indicates that it played an important role in bringing the classics of Greek philosophy to Europe, with translations from Greek to Arabic to Hebrew and Latin. Jerrilynn Dodds references this concept in the spatial orientation seen in architecture that draws on building styles seen in synagogues and mosques.

An example of Convivencia was Córdoba, Andalusia in Al-Andalus, in the ninth and tenth centuries. Córdoba was “one of the most important cities in the history of the world.” In it, “Christians and Jews were involved in the Royal Court and the intellectual life of the city.” María Rosa Menocal,  Sterling Professor of Humanities at Yale University, further describes the libraries of Córdoba as "a significant benchmark of overall social (not just scholarly) well being, since they represented a near-perfect crossroads of the material and the intellectual."

James L. Heft, the Alton Brooks Professor of Religion at USC, describes Convivencia as one of the “rare periods in history” when the three religions did not either keep “their distance from one another, or were in conflict.” During most of their co-existing history, they have been “ignorant about each other” or “attacked each other.”

Historical context

The period of Islamic rule in the Iberian Peninsula began in the early eighth century when Arab invaders took political control over the Iberian Peninsula, calling it al-Andalus. With the death of ruler Al-Hakam in 976, the Caliphate began to dissolve and fragmented into six large states and a number of smaller ones. Al-Andalus was briefly consolidated again by Muslim invaders and reformists, the Almoravids and the Almohads, in the eleventh and twelfth centuries. The Christian kingdoms progressively expanded south taking over Muslim territory in what is historiographically known as the Reconquista, effectively confining al-Andalus to the southern emirate of Granada, ruled by the Nasrid dynasty from 1231 to 1492.

End of the Convivencia

The latter Almohad Muslim dynasty forced Christians and Jews to convert, and forced Muslims into their interpretation of the faith. Among those who chose exile rather than conversion or death was the Jewish philosopher Maimonides.

While the Reconquista was ongoing, Muslims and Jews who came under Christian control were allowed to practise their religion to some degree. This ended in the late 15th century with the fall of Granada in 1492. Even before this event, the Spanish Inquisition had been established in 1478. In 1492, with the Alhambra decree, those Jews who had not converted to Catholicism were expelled. Many Jews settled in Portugal, where they were expelled in 1497.

Following a failed revolt in Granada in 1499, the Muslims in Granada and in the Crown of Castile were forced to convert, face death, or be expelled. This happened as the treaty assuring religious freedom at the time of Granada's surrender in 1492 was seen as voided by the rebellion. Between 1500 and 1502 all remaining Muslims of Granada and Castile were converted. In 1525, Muslims in Aragon were similarly forced to convert. The Muslim communities who converted became known as Moriscos. Still they were suspected by the old Christians of being crypto-Muslims and so between 1609 and 1614 their entire population of 300,000 was forcibly expelled. All these expulsions and conversions resulted in Catholic Christianity becoming the sole sanctioned religion in the Iberian Peninsula.

As Anna Akasoy has summarized in a review article, Menocal "argues that the narrow-minded forces that brought about its end were external", both from the North African Muslim Almoravids and Almohads, and Christian northerners.

Major groups
 Moors (Muslims in Al-Andalus)
 Morisco (Muslim converts to Catholism)
 Mozarab (Christians in Al-Andalus)
 Mudéjar (Muslims in Christendom)
 Muwallad (Christian converts to Islam)
 Sephardim (Jews in Iberia)

Primary sources
Muslims question whether celebrating Christian traditions is permitted

The first source is a collection of letters in which the Islamic leaders were asked about the legality of Muslims' observance and participation in Christian festivals.

Rules for the Christians from the early twelfth century
Rules Muslims should follow when living among Christians.

Letter from Jewish philosopher Moses Maimonides (1135-1204) fleeing Al-Andalus

Debate
The idea of convivencia has had supporters and detractors from the time Castro first proposed it.  Hussein Fancy has summarized the underlying assumptions on both sides of the debate: "The convivencia debates were never about political ideologies or partisan politics, as they are often construed, but rather," as Ryan Szpiech has argued, "about fundamental and unresolved methodological and philosophical issues. While Castro appealed to philosophical interpretivism, [Claudio] Sánchez-Albornoz appealed to scientific positivism."

David Nirenberg challenged the significance of the age of "convivencia," claiming that far from a "peaceful convivencia" his own work "demonstrates that violence was a central and systemic aspect of the coexistence of majority and minority in medieval Spain, and even suggests that coexistence was in part predicated on such violence".

Some critics of the concept of Convivencia point to the execution of the Martyrs of Córdoba during the 850s as a challenge.

Mark Cohen, professor of Near Eastern studies at Princeton University, in his Under Crescent and Cross, calls the idealized interfaith utopia a myth that was first promulgated by Jewish historians such as Heinrich Graetz in the 19th century as a rebuke to Christian countries for their treatment of Jews. This myth was met with what Cohen calls the "counter-myth" of the "neo-lachrymose conception of Jewish-Arab history" by Bat Yeor and others, which also "cannot be maintained in the light of historical reality". Cohen aims to present a correction to both these "myths".

The Spanish medievalist Eduardo Manzano Moreno wrote that the concept of convivencia has no support in the historical record [“el concepto de convivencia no tiene ninguna apoyatura histórica“]. He further states that there is scarcely any information available on the Jewish and Christian communities during the Caliphate of Cordoba, and that this may come as a shock in view of the huge clout of the convivencia meme [“... quizá pueda resultar chocante teniendo en cuenta el enorme peso del tópico convivencial.”] According to Manzano, Castro's conception "was never converted into a specific and well-documented treatment of al-Andalus, perhaps because Castro never succeeded in finding in the Arabist bibliography materials suitable for incorporation into his interpretation.”

"Contemporary ecumenicists appeal to the 'Golden Age' of tolerance" in the 10th and 11th centuries in Córdoba under Muslim rule, but, for the most part, they are not interested in what actually happened among the Jews, Christians, and Muslims. Rather, they mention "tolerance", a concept that "would have had little or no meaning" at that time.

See also

 Al-Andalus (Moorish-governed Iberia)
 Pablo Alvaro (a Jewish convert to Catholicism)
 Bishop Bodo  (a Catholic convert to Judaism)
 Golden age of Jewish culture in Spain
 Islamic Golden Age
 Timeline of the Muslim presence in the Iberian Peninsula
 Muslim conquests

Sources and further reading
Ariel, Yaakov: “Was there a Golden Age of Christian-Jewish Relations?” Presentation at a Conference at Boston College, April 2010.
Catlos, Brian. The Victors and the Vanquished • Christians and Muslims of Catalonia and Aragon, 1050–1300, 2004. .
Esperanza Alfonso, Islamic culture through Jewish eyes : al-Andalus from the tenth to twelfth century ; 2007, .
Fernández-Morera, Darío : "The Myth of the Andalusian Paradise" ; in: the Intercollegiate Review, Fall 2006, pp. 23–31.
Mann, Vivian B., Glick, Thomas F., Dodds, & Jerrilynn Denise, Convivencia: Jews, Muslims, and Christians in Medieval Spain. G. Braziller, 1992. .
O'Shea, Stephen. Sea of Faith: Islam and Christianity in the Medieval Mediterranean World. Walker & Company, 2006. .
Pick, Lucy. Conflict and Coexistence: Archbishop Rodrigo and the Muslims and Jews of Medieval Spain. Oxbow Books, 2004. .
María Rosa Menocal, Ornament of the World • How Muslims, Jews, and Christians Created a Culture of Tolerance in Medieval Spain, 2003. .
Boum, Aomar. The Performance of Convivencia: Communities of Tolerance and the Reification of Toleration. Religion Compass 6/3 (2012): 174–184, 10.1111/j.1749-8171.2012.00342.x

References

External links
Sarah-Mae Thomas. The Convivencia in Islamic Spain July - August 2013
Rageh Omaar An Islamic History of Europe. Video documentary of 90 minutes for BBC Four, 2005.
Catherine Bott. Convivencia. Music CD of Spanish and Moorish songs from the period.
Convivencia. International research project.
Cities of Light is a 6 min video about collaboration between Spanish Jewish, Muslim and Christian scientists in 12th century Spain. It features the works of Maimonides (Jewish philosopher) and Averroes (Muslim philosopher).

Religion in Al-Andalus
History of Al-Andalus
Jewish Spanish history
Historiography of Spain
Islam and other religions
Religious pluralism